Ratikant Mohapatra is a dancer, percussionist, Guru, and Choreographer and archivist of Odissi. Under the direction and choreography of Ratikant Mohapatra, 555 Odissi dancers, a large number of them belonging to foreign countries, performed in unison at Kalinga Stadium, Bhubaneswar to enter their names in the Guinness Book of World Records. Odissi Dance entered into Indo-Chinese Movie The Desire under the choreography of Guru Ratikant Mohapatra.

Early life

Dance choreography
 2004: Varsha, Shantakaram, Sunaman (Hindi Abhinaya), Eka Lakshya   Chaturpakshya, Bedanudharate (Dasavtara)
 2005: Jaya Mahesha, Namodevi, Shiva Panchmukha Stotram, Allah, Jhumi Jhumi Gopiyan (Hindi Abhinaya), Mokshya 
 2006: Tarana Pallavi, Bhaja Govindam, Natangi, Bakratunda (Ganesh Bandana)
 2007: Charukeshi Pallavi, Sudha Dhaibat Vibhash Pallvi, OM, Kahibu Jai (Odiya Abhinaya), Matangi Dhyanam.
 2008: Nabadurga, Isi Basanta me, Nagendra Haraya, Sri Ramachandra Krupalu Bhajaman, Mrutyu, Megh Pallavi, Pattadip Pallavi, Nati Puja (Madhava Bhajan)
 2009: Bali Badha, Geeta Govinda, Naari, Sakuntala, Shiva Vandana, Dasavtar, Ganapati Papa Morriya.
 2010: Tantra, Swargatam Krishna.
 2011: Guru Bramha, Ravana, Yathagamanam, Ananda Lahari
 2012: Chandrakosh Pallavi, Nagendra Haraya, Bho Shambho & Bishwas
 2013: Geetamritam, Saggy Baggy, Sabari
 2014: Ardhanishwar, Samakala, Synthesis & Kubjaa
 2015: Abhanga (Hey igo vithalle bhakta jana baschale), Tarana. Namami Gange, Odia Abhinaya "Se Shyama Chhabi Chhataka", Purnangabaradi Pallavi.
 2016: Vinayaka-Smaranam, Tyaaga, Mahanayaka Bijayananda.
 2017: Hari Smarane, Mangaladhwani Pallavi.
 2018: Kirwani Madhurima, Maati

Awards and honors
 Invited by the ministry of Human Resource Development, Dept. of  Culture, Govt. of India as an expert committee member to select the candidates under the scheme of "Scholarship to young artists in different cultural forms."
 Received junior fellowship on Mardala from Ministry of Human   Resource  Development, Govt. of India.
Received a state level "Nrutyasri Award" from Mohansunder Devgoswami Smruti Sansad, Puri.
 Invited by the national Song & Drama Division, Govt. of India as the Expert Member of the screening committee for selecting the artiste.
 Awarded for the best presentation of Odissi dance for Cultural & Philanthropic Society, Calcutta High Court.
 Barabati Nrutyotsav (national Festival of Dance & Music), Cuttack, awarded "Honour of Adore" for the best performance in Dashanana ballet in 2003.
 Honoured by Indian Performing Arts Promotion Inc., Washington Dc, USA for the valued contribution in Odissi dance in 2003.
 Honoured with the National Award "Pride of India" by Chinta-O-Chetna, Bhubaneswar 2004.
 Honoured with "Sanjukta Panigrahi Samman" by Sanjukta Panigrahi Memorial Trust, Bhubaneswar, 2005.
 Honoured with "Nrutya Bhushan" by International Dance & Theatre  Festival 2005 at Cuttack.
 Honoured with "Nritya Shiromani" by Utkal Yuva Sanskrutik Sangh at Cuttack, 2010.
 Honoured with "Nrutya Bharati Samman 2010" by Sangeet Sudhakar Smruti Sansad at Bhubaneswar, 2011.
 Created with his choreography the Gunnies Book of World Records with 555 Odissi Dancers, a large number of them belonging to foreign countries, performed in unison at Kalinga Stadium, Bhubaneswar during the International Odissi dance Festival 2011, Jointly organized by IPAP, USA, Dept. of Culture & Tourism, Govt. of Odisha.  
 Honoured with "Ka Sanskruti Samman 2011" by Shraddha Suman Creative Arts, New Delhi.
 Honoured with "Vysakhi Excellence Award 2012" by Natraj Music Dance Academy, Visakhapatnam.
 Honored with "IDC Award of Excellence-2012" by International Dance Congress, Bhubaneswar.
 Honored with "Manana Award 2013 for his long standing contribution to Odissi Dance as a Choreographer, Teacher, Performer and a Mardala player"  by Manana Natya Sanstha, Bhubaneswar
 Honored with “SKGS Diamond Jubilee Nritya Choodamani  2014” by Sri Krishna Gana Sabha, Chennai.
 Honored with "Bhumiputra Samman" 2016 by Bharat Sevashram Sangha, Puri
 Honored with prestigious "Sangeet Natak Akademi Award" for Odissi Dance for the year 2016

Performances
Some major performances staged by Ratikant Mohapatra are: France- Festival of India and International Mime Festival; Germany- Festival of India and Autumn Festival; Japan - Festival of India; Russia- Festival of India; United Kingdom- Festival of India, Sanskritik Festival; Canada- Society of Fine Arts & Dance Academy of Ms Meneka Thakkar; Hong Kong- Vrundavan Dance & Music Academy of Pdt. Hari Prasad Chaurasia; Dubai- Sponsored Programmes; USA- 70th International Birth Anniversary Celebration of Guru Kelucharan Mohapatra in 1996, India Festival, Sponsored programs; Australia- ICCR Cultural Delegate & Sponsored programmes.

References

External links
 https://web.archive.org/web/20120404192928/http://www.srjan.com/guru_ratikanta.aspx

1965 births
Living people
Indian dance teachers
Odissi exponents
Performers of Indian classical dance
Indian classical choreographers
Indian choreographers
Dancers from Odisha
People from Cuttack
Teachers of Indian classical dance
20th-century Indian dancers
Educators from Odisha
Recipients of the Sangeet Natak Akademi Award